Ioannis Theotokis (1880 – 6 June 1961) was a Greek politician. He was born in Athens 1880, he was the son of Georgios Theotokis.

He was elected a member of the Hellenic Parliament seven times and served as Minister for Agriculture three times, before being shortly Prime Minister of a caretaker government in 1950. He died in Corfu in 1961.

1880 births
1961 deaths
20th-century prime ministers of Greece
Foreign ministers of Greece
Prime Ministers of Greece
Agriculture ministers of Greece
Speakers of the Hellenic Parliament
Deputy Prime Ministers of Greece
MPs of Corfu
Children of national leaders
Theotokis family
Politicians from Athens